Roberto Maximiliano Pereyra (born 7 January 1991) is an Argentine professional footballer who plays for  club Udinese and the Argentina national team. A right-footed player, his preferred position is as a midfielder or as a forward. Due to his versatility, he is capable of playing a variety of positions such as left or right wing, central midfield, attacking midfield or second striker.

After beginning his career in Argentina with River Plate, he joined Italian club Udinese in 2011, where his performances earned him a loan to defending league champions Juventus in 2014; he was signed permanently by The Old Lady in 2015 and won two consecutive Serie A titles during his time with the club. During his time in Italy, he developed into a well-rounded, adaptable, and tactically versatile player due to his dynamism, energy, and technique, as well as his offensive and defensive work-rate and attributes. In 2016, he joined English Premier League club Watford.

At international level, Pereyra made his senior debut in 2014, and has since obtained over ten caps; he represented the Argentina national football team at two editions of the Copa América, winning a runners-up medal and a bronze medal in the 2015 and the 2019 editions of the tournament respectively.

Club career

River Plate
Born in San Miguel de Tucumán, Argentina, Pereyra began his career within the youth academy of River Plate; due to his origins, he was given the nickname "El Tucumano". His professional career began in 2009 when he made his River Plate debut in the Argentine Primera Division against Huracan at the age of 18. After featuring on 43 occasions for River, Pereyra transferred across the Atlantic Ocean, swapping continents, as he joined Udinese Calcio ahead of the 2011–12 Serie A season.

Udinese Calcio
Officially signing for Udinese on 30 August 2011, Pereyra signed a five-year contract with the Friuli outfit, and went on to make 15 appearances in all competitions during his debut season in Italy. His performances for Udinese during a three–year spell saw him contribute eight goals and seven assists in 84 league appearances, while he also represented the club in 6 Coppa Italia matches, 2 UEFA Champions League matches, and 12 UEFA Europa League games.

Juventus

On 25 July 2014, Pereyra officially signed for, at the time, three-time defending Serie A champions Juventus on a season-long loan deal from Udinese worth €1.5 million, with the option to sign the player outright at the conclusion of the 2014–15 Serie A campaign for an additional €14 million. On the same day, Pereyra appeared for his club in their first friendly match of the season against Lucento. On 23 August 2014, he featured for Juventus in the annual Trofeo TIM. Pereyra capitalised on Francesco Magnanelli’s failed clearance to sidefoot home from just outside the six-yard box.

On 6 June 2015, Pereyra appeared as a substitute for Juventus in the 2015 UEFA Champions League Final as La Vecchia Signora was defeated 3–1 by FC Barcelona at Berlin's Olympiastadion. With 52 appearances, he made the most appearances for Juventus that season across all competitions, along with teammates Claudio Marchisio and Leonardo Bonucci.

On 23 June 2015, Juventus bought out Pereyra's Udinese loan for €14 million, keeping him at Juventus until 2019.

Watford
On 19 August 2016, Pereyra moved to Watford on a five-year deal for an undisclosed fee. According to an official club statement released by Juventus, the transfer is worth €13 million, with a possible €2 million in bonuses, which is to be paid over a four-year period. He was assigned the number 37 shirt for the 2016–17 season. On his Watford debut, Pereyra scored his first goal for the club in a 3–1 home defeat to Arsenal in the Premier League, on 27 August. On 5 February 2018, he came off the bench to score the fourth goal in a 4–1 thrashing of Chelsea.

Return to Udinese
Pereyra re-joined Italian side Udinese on 28 September 2020 for an undisclosed fee.

International career
Pereyra was selected to represent the Argentine under-20 football team at the 2011 FIFA U-20 World Cup. He played all three group games at the tournament, helping Argentina defeat Mexico and North Korea and draw with England. He missed Argentina's 2–1 Round of 16 victory over Egypt through suspension, but returned to the starting line-up in the quarter-final clash against Portugal, which Argentina lost on penalty kicks after neither team could score during 120 minutes.

He made his senior debut for Argentina on Saturday 11 October 2014 in a 2–0 friendly match loss against Brazil played in Beijing, China after being called up by Gerardo Martino.

Pereyra was a part of the Argentina national team at the 2015 Copa América, winning a runners-up medal.

On 11 October 2018, Pereyra scored his first senior international goal for Argentina in a 4–0 friendly win over Iraq in Saudi Arabia.

On 21 May 2019, he was included in Lionel Scaloni's final 23-man Argentina squad for the 2019 Copa América.

Style of play
Pereyra is a quick, dynamic, and hardworking player, who possesses notable stamina, pace, crossing ability, and vision, as well as good technique and dribbling skills. A creative, well-rounded and tactically versatile right-footed midfielder, who is capable of using either foot, Pereyra is able to play in several midfield and offensive positions, due to his adaptability, and energy, in addition to his offensive and defensive work-rate and attributes. He is usually deployed as an offensive midfielder in the centre, or as wide midfielder, on either flank, although his preferred position is on the left wing; he has even played as a second striker on occasion, or in a deeper role as a central midfielder. Due to his attributes, playing position and nationality, he was compared to the former Italo-Argentine Juventus winger Mauro Camoranesi during his time in Italy.

Career statistics

Club

International

Scores and results list Argentina's goal tally first, score column indicates score after each Pereyra goal.

Honours
Juventus
 Serie A: 2014–15, 2015–16
 Coppa Italia: 2014–15, 2015–16
 Supercoppa Italiana: 2015

Watford
 FA Cup runner-up: 2018–19

References

External links

 Argentine Primera statistics at Fútbol XXI  
 

1991 births
Living people
Sportspeople from San Miguel de Tucumán
Argentine footballers
Argentina under-20 international footballers
Argentina international footballers
Association football wingers
Club Atlético River Plate footballers
Udinese Calcio players
Juventus F.C. players
Watford F.C. players
Argentine Primera División players
Serie A players
Premier League players
2015 Copa América players
2019 Copa América players
Argentine expatriate footballers
Argentine expatriate sportspeople in Italy
Argentine expatriate sportspeople in England
Expatriate footballers in Italy
Expatriate footballers in England
FA Cup Final players